Orkney Ferries is a Scottish company operating inter-island ferry services in the Orkney Islands. The company operates ferry services across 15 islands.

History
The company is owned by the Orkney Islands Council and was established in 1960 as the Orkney Islands Shipping Company.

In 1991, the Orkney Islands Shipping Company acquired a private sector ferry company also called Orkney Ferries, which had been established to compete on the short sea crossing from the Scottish mainland to the Orkney Islands, but which had not succeeded in establishing the route. This company's ferry was assimilated into the inter-island fleet, and in 1995 the Orkney Islands Shipping Company adopted the name Orkney Ferries. Despite this acquisition and change of name, the current Orkney Ferries does not operate services to and from the Scottish mainland, leaving this to other operators such as NorthLink Ferries and Pentland Ferries.

Services

Orkney Ferries operate between the Orkney mainland and fourteen of the smaller islands. Services  include:

 The North Isles service, linking Kirkwall on Orkney Mainland to the northern isles of Eday, Sanday, Stronsay, Westray, Papay, and North Ronaldsay.
 The Shapinsay service, linking Kirkwall on Orkney Mainland to the northern island of Shapinsay. 
 The Rousay, Egilsay and Wyre service, linking Tingwall on Orkney Mainland to the northern isles of Rousay, Egilsay and Wyre. 
 The South Isles service, linking Houton on the Orkney Mainland to the southern islands of Hoy, South Walls and Flotta. 
 The Graemsay and North Hoy service, linking Stromness on Orkney Mainland to the southern islands of Hoy and Graemsay.
 The Westray to Papa Westray service, linking the islands of Westray and Papay.

Fleet

Orkney Ferries operates a fleet of inter-island vessels, most of which were specially built for service in the islands. The fleet includes:

These ferries carry 190 passengers and 25 cars, and are normally used on the North Isles service.
 , built by Cochrane Shipbuilders of Selby in 1988 for the earlier Orkney Ferries, and acquired with the company in 1991. This ferry carries 144 passengers and 32 cars, and is normally used on the North Isles service.
 , built by Yorkshire Drydock of Hull in 1989. This ferry carries 91 passengers and 11 cars, and is normally used on the Shapinsay service.
 , built by Campbeltown Shipyard of Campbeltown in 1991. This ferry carries 125 passengers and 16 cars, and is used on both the Shapinsay and South Isles services.
 , built by Bideford Shipyard of Bideford in 1973. This passenger ferry carries 40 passengers, and is normally used on the Westray to Papa Westray service.
 , built by Ailsa Shipbuilding Company of Troon in 1996. This ferry carries 73 passengers and 1 car, and is normally used on the Graemsay and North Hoy service.
 , built by Abels Shipbuilders of Bristol in 1987. This ferry carries 95 passengers and 11 cars, and is normally used on the Rousay, Egilsay and Wyre service.
 , built by Appledore Shipbuilders of Appledore in 1994. This ferry carries 125 passengers and 18 cars, and is normally used on the South Isles service.
 , built in Norway in 2012 and acquired by Orkney Ferries in 2020 to replace . She was to operate on both the Westray to Papa Westray and Graemsay and North Hoy services but has been plagued by issues since arrival.

References

External links

Orkney Ferries web site

1960 establishments in Scotland
1960 in transport
Transport in Orkney
Companies based in Orkney
Transport companies established in 1960
Companies owned by municipalities of Scotland
Ferry companies of Scotland
Kirkwall